The following is a comprehensive discography of Swedish DJ and producer Eric Prydz. His discography comprises one studio album, one compilation album, three extended plays, eighteen singles, and other releases under various aliases.

Albums

Studio albums

Compilation albums

Extended plays

Singles

Other charted songs

Remixes

As Pryda

Extended plays

Singles

Remixes

As Cirez D

Extended plays

Singles
2003
 Diamond Girl / It's Over / W-Dizco
2004
 Control Freak / Hoodpecker
 Deep Inside
2005
 Knockout / Lost Love
 Re-Match / B-Boy
 Teaser / Lollipop
2006
 Punch Drunk / Copyrat
 Mouseville Theme
2007
 Horizons / Tigerstyle
2008
 Läget?
 Stockholm Marathon / The Journey
2009
 The Tunnel / Raptor
 On Off / Fast Forward
2010
 Glow
 Bauerpost / Glow (In the Dark Dub)
 The Tumble / EXIT
2011
 Full Stop
 Tomorrow / Sirtos Madness (with Acki Kokotos)
 Mokba
2013
 Thunderstuck / Drums in the Deep
2014
 Accents / Revolution (free download)
 Ruby
2016
 In the Reds / Century of the Mouse
 Backlash / The Tournament
2017
 The Accuser
2018
 Dare U / The Glitch / Black Hole
2020
 Valborg / The Raid

Remixes
2006
 Double 99 – R.I.P. Groove (Cirez D Remix)

2008
 Christian Smith & John Selway – Total Departure (Cirez D Remix)

2018
 Beton (featuring Wevie Stonder) – Directions (The Cirez D Edit)

As A&P Project

Singles

2003
 Sunrize (featuring Zemya Hamilton) (with Steve Angello)

As AxEr

Singles

2006
 123 / 321 (with Axwell)

As Fiol Lasse

Singles

2009
 Svedala

As Groove System

Singles

2001
 Vacuum Cleaner / Chord Funk (with Marcus Stork)

As Hardform

Singles

2003
 Dirty Souls / Fear tha Pimps / Back to the Groove (with Marcus Stork)

As Moo

Singles

2002
 Seashells
2003
 Jonico (Mediterranean Mix) (with Luciano Ingrosso)
 Sunset at Keywest

As Sheridan

Singles

2002
 Sunlight Dancing
 Wants vs. Needs
2004
 High on You
2006
 Fatz Theme / Flycker

As The Dukes of Sluca

Singles

2002
 Don't Stop / Steam Machine / Always Searching (with Andreas Postl)
2003
 Mighty Love (vs. Apollo) (with Andreas Postl)

As Tonja Holma

Extended plays
2017
 Tonja Holma

Singles
2021
 All Night

References

Eric Prydz songs
Prydz, Eric